Kerala State Council for Science, Technology and Environment (KSCSTE) is an autonomous body constituted by the Government of Kerala in November 2002 to encourage and promote science and technology-related activities in Kerala State. Prior to the establishment of KSCSTE, the body responsible for carrying out similar work was the State Committee for Science, Technology and Environment (STEC) established in 1972. KSCSTE was formed by restructuring STEC  in concurrence with the Science Policy of Government of India.

Based in Thiruvananthapuram, KSCSTE is running seven R&D centres in different parts of Kerala. It has several programmes like Coastal Zone Management, Science Popularisation and Women Scientists Cell to promote its objectives. The Council coordinates the state-level activities in connection with the observances of the National Science Day, National Technology Day and World Environment Day. It has instituted three awards: Vasudev Award, Science Literature Awards and Young Scientists Award which are presented annually. Every year KSCSTE also organises the Kerala Science Congress and Children's Science Congress. It supports two grant-in-aid centres as well.

The apex body of KSCSTE is the State Council with Chief Minister of Kerala as the president. The chief executive officer of the Council is Executive Vice President.

R&D centres under KSCSTE

Centre for Water Resources Development and Management (CWRDM): To develop R&D needs in the field of water management.
Kerala Forest Research Institute (KFRI): To undertake research in areas like forestry, biodiversity etc., that are vital to the development of the Kerala State. 
National Transportation Planning and Research Centre (NATPAC) : To undertake research and consultancy works in the fields of traffic engineering and transportation planning, highway engineering, public transport system, inland water transport, tourism planning, rural roads, environmental impact assessment and transport energy. 
Tropical Botanic Garden and Research Institute (TBGRI): To develop technology for  conservation and sustainable utilization of the plant biodiversity of India, particularly of Kerala for the well-being of her people. 
Kerala School of Mathematics (KSoM): Setup as a joint venture of KSCSTE and National Board for Higher Mathematics, under Department of Atomic Energy, Government of India. The main objective of the institute is to promote mathematical research in the country and particularly in Kerala.
Srinivasa Ramanujan Institute of Basic Sciences (SRIBS) is a capacity building initiative of KSCSTE in basic sciences. The institute was created in 2012 to commemorate the 125th birth anniversary of  Srinivasa Ramanujan, the legendary Indian mathematician.
Kerala State Centre for Assistive Technologies (KSCAT) Kerala State Centre For Assistive Technologies is an organization under Kerala State Council for Science Technology and Environment [KSCSTE] The vision and mission of the centre is to create a barrier free environment with a spirit to provide access to all. The activities of the centre should be according to the guidelines of the United Nations' Convention of Rights of Persons with Disabilities (UNCRPD) and Persons with Disabilities (Equal Opportunities, Protection of Rights and Full Participation) Act, 1995. http://www.kscat.kerala.gov.in/
Malabar Botanical Garden and Institute for Plant Sciences (MBGIP)  
State-Centre Resource Institute for Partnership in Technology (SCRIPT)
Critical Mineral Research Institute (CMRI)
Institute of Advanced Virology, Kerala: On the wake of deadly Nipah virus outbreak in the Kozhikode district of Kerala this research institute was established for research and diagnostics on emerging viral diseases in the state

Grant-in-aid Centres of KSCSTE
Integrated Rural Technology Centre: Research and Development institution established by Kerala Sasthra Sahithya Parishad (KSSP), specializing in areas such as energy, waste management, environment, natural resources, livelihood, tribal development, agriculture, etc.
Cochin University of Science and Technology#Sophisticated Test and Instrumentation Centre (STIC): Joint venture of KSCSTE and CUSAT

Former R&D centres under KSCSTE
Rajiv Gandhi Center for Biotechnology (RGCB): To pursue research in biotechnology. The Center has a Regional Facility for Genetic Fingerprinting, which provides DNA analysis services for forensic and criminal investigations, paternity disputes, identification of wildlife remains, authentication of plants and seeds besides a battery of molecular diagnostics for genetic and infectious diseases.
Centre for Earth Science Studies (CESS): To promote modern scientific and technological research and development studies in earth sciences. CESS pursues multidisciplinary research in problems related to land, sea and atmosphere, Research & Development activities in basic and applied fields, user training and academic programs, consultancy and Science popularization. 
Agency for Non-conventional Energy and Rural Technology (ANERT). 
Centre for Development Studies (CDS).

References

External links

Official web portal of KSCSTE : KSCSTE
Website of IRTC : IRTC
Website of KSSP : KSSP

State agencies of Kerala
Scientific organisations based in India
Science and technology in Kerala
Organisations based in Thiruvananthapuram
Scientific organizations established in 2002
Government agencies established in 2002
2002 establishments in Kerala